This article lists several species of reef-associated sharks which are known by the common name reef sharks.

In the Indian and Pacific Oceans:
 Blacktip reef shark
 Grey reef shark
 Whitetip reef shark
In the Atlantic and Pacific Oceans:
 Galapagos shark
In the Atlantic Ocean:
 Caribbean reef shark

References

Sharks

Fish common names
Former disambiguation pages converted to set index articles